Pedro Gil station (sometimes called Herran station) is an elevated Manila Light Rail Transit (LRT) station situated on Line 1. The station serves Ermita in Manila and is located at the corner of Taft Avenue and Pedro Gil Street. The station takes its name from Pedro Gil Street, which is used to be named Herran Street.

Pedro Gil station is the seventh station for trains headed to Roosevelt and the fourteenth station for trains headed to Baclaran.

Landmarks near the station include the Philippine General Hospital, the University of the Philippines Manila, Philippine Christian University, Philippine Women's University, Robinsons Manila, and St. Paul University Manila.

Transportation links
Pedro Gil station is well-served by taxis, jeepneys, buses, and UV Express that ply the Taft Avenue route and nearby routes. Taxis and jeepneys stop near the station and can be used to transport commuters to and from Ermita.

Gallery

See also
List of rail transit stations in Metro Manila
Manila Light Rail Transit System

Manila Light Rail Transit System stations
Railway stations opened in 1984
Buildings and structures in Ermita